Jung Hye-sun (born Jung Young-ja; February 21, 1942) is a South Korean actress. Jung made her entertainment debut as a voice actress with the KBS Daejeon Radio in 1960, then began acting onscreen through the first KBS public audition in 1961. She has been active in Korean film, television and theater for more than five decades.

Filmography

Film

Television series

Theater

Awards and nominations

State honors

Notes

References

External links
 
 
 
 

1942 births
Living people
20th-century South Korean actresses
21st-century South Korean actresses
South Korean film actresses
South Korean television actresses
South Korean stage actresses
South Korean musical theatre actresses
Best Actress Paeksang Arts Award (television) winners